Earl of Eldon, in the County Palatine of Durham, is a title in the Peerage of the United Kingdom. It was created  in 1821 for the lawyer and politician John Scott, 1st Baron Eldon, Lord Chancellor from 1801 to 1806 and again from 1807 to 1827. He had already been created Baron Eldon, of Eldon in the County Palatine of Durham, in the Peerage of Great Britain in 1799, and was made Viscount Encombe, of Encombe in the County of Dorset, at the same time was given the earldom. His grandson, the second Earl, briefly represented Truro in the House of Commons.

 the titles are held by the latter's great-great-great-grandson, the sixth Earl, who succeeded his father in 2017.

William Scott, 1st Baron Stowell, was the elder brother of the first Earl of Eldon. The Hon. Sir Ernest Scott, second son of the third Earl, was Envoy Extraordinary and Minister Plenipotentiary to Hungary.

The family seat was, until the 20th century, Encombe Park, near Kingston in Dorset.

Earls of Eldon (1821)
John Scott, 1st Earl of Eldon (1751–1838)
Hon. John Scott (1774–1805)
John Scott, 2nd Earl of Eldon (1805–1854)
John Scott, 3rd Earl of Eldon (1845–1926)
John Scott, Viscount Encombe (1870–1900)
John Scott, 4th Earl of Eldon (1899–1976)
John Joseph Nicholas Scott, 5th Earl of Eldon (1937–2017)
John Francis Thomas Marie Joseph Columba Fidelis Scott, 6th Earl of Eldon (b. 1962)

Present peer
John Francis Scott, 6th Earl of Eldon (born 9 July 1962) is the son of the 5th Earl and his wife Claudine de Montjoye-Vaufrey et de la Roche and was educated at Ampleforth College. He was styled as Viscount Encombe between 1976 and 30 January 2017, when he succeeded to his father's peerages.

He married Charlotte de Vlaming, and they have two children:
Lady Helena Rose Columba Scott (born 1994)
John James Robert Columba Scott, Viscount Encombe (born 1996), the heir apparent.

See also
Baron Stowell
Ships called Earl of Eldon or Lord Eldon
Bedford Square

References

Attribution

 Kidd, Charles, & Williamson, David (editors). Debrett's Peerage and Baronetage (1990 edition). New York: St Martin's Press, 1990.

External links

Earldoms in the Peerage of the United Kingdom
Earl
Noble titles created in 1821
Scott family (England)
Earl of Eldon